Baldi is a murder mystery series first broadcast on the UK radio station BBC Radio 4. The central character is Paolo Baldi (played by David Threlfall), a Franciscan priest on sabbatical, lecturing on semiotics at a university in contemporary Dublin.  After helping the police as a translator for an Italian witness, he turns sleuth.  Created by Barry Devlin, it was produced by BBC Northern Ireland.  Series 1 began broadcasting in 2000, while Series 5 concluded at the end of 2010.

Summary
Father Paolo Baldi (David Threlfall) is a priest torn between his interest in investigation and detective work, and the secluded life of a priest. On sabbatical from the Franciscan Order, he takes up amateur sleuthing and befriends DI Tina Mahon (Tina Kellegher for the first four series, then Tara Flynn), a member of the Gardaí. Both her superior, DS Rynne (Owen Roe), and Baldi's spiritual director, Father Troy (T. P. McKenna), would prefer that he end his sabbatical and return to the Order. Father Baldi has an unfortunate knack of becoming involved in murder enquires, usually by his friendship with one of those involved. His gentle, reassuring behaviour and the Seal of the Confessional encourages participants to open up to him.

Broadcasting
Five series have been broadcast, totalling twenty-eight episodes. These have all been first aired in the 45 minute Afternoon Play slot, with frequent repeats of the series on BBC Radio 4 Extra. The regular cast included David Threlfall, Tina Kellegher, Owen Roe and T. P. McKenna. Guest appearances have included some of Ireland and the UK 's leading actors, including Gerard McSorley, Martin Clunes, Stephen Mangan, Margaret D'Arcy, Niall Buggy, Adrian Dunbar, Michael Maloney, Bill Nighy, Sorcha Cusack, Geraldine James, Niall Toibin, Barry McGovern, Nick Dunning, David Kelly, Stephen Moore, Pauline McLynn, Sara Kestelman, Robert Bathurst, John Kavanagh, Mark Lambert and Victoria Smurfit.

The theme tune is by Sting, and is called "Saint Agnes and the Burning Train".

Episodes

Technical crew
Executive Producer – Sarah Lawson
Producer/Director – Lawrence Jackson, also Mark Lambert for some episodes
Writers have included:
Simon Brett
Bill Murphy
Andrew Martin
Martin Meenan
John Murphy
Francis Turnly

External links
Baldi – BBC.co.uk programme page

References

British radio dramas
BBC Radio 4 programmes
BBC Radio dramas
Detective radio shows